Viburnum arboreum is a species of plant in the Adoxaceae family. It is endemic to Jamaica.

References

arboreum
Vulnerable plants
Endemic flora of Jamaica
Taxonomy articles created by Polbot